List of caves in Serbia.

See also 
 List of caves
 Speleology

External links
 National Tourism Organization of Serbia 
 Resavska cave

 
Serbia
Caves